Josef Fischer (20 January 1865 – 3 March 1953) was a German road bicycle racer. He is best known for winning the first edition of Paris–Roubaix in 1896 and Bordeaux–Paris in 1900.

Major results

1893
1st, Vienna–Berlin
1896
1st, Paris–Roubaix
1899
2nd, Bordeaux–Paris
1900
1st, Bordeaux–Paris
2nd, Paris–Roubaix
1903
15th, Tour de France

1865 births
1953 deaths
People from Cham (district)
Sportspeople from the Upper Palatinate
German male cyclists
People from the Kingdom of Bavaria
Cyclists from Bavaria